Mary Knight Dunlap (1910–1992) founded the Association of Women Veterinarians in 1947.

Dunlap was from Baltimore, Maryland. In 1926, she began a four-year degree in veterinary medicine at Colorado A&M; however, she dropped out after her second year. She continued to pursue her interest in veterinary medicine and wrote abstracts and reports of meetings for the North American Veterinarian and other publications.<ref name="MKDunlapBio">{{cite web |url=http://www.womenveterinarians.org/Main.aspx |title=Mary Knight Dunlap (MSU-33) |work=Our History of Women in Veterinary Medicine |publisher=Association of Women Veterinarians Foundation |accessdate=25 July 2013 |archive-date=15 June 2012 |archive-url=https://web.archive.org/web/20120615134409/http://www.womenveterinarians.org/Main.aspx |url-status=dead }}</ref>
 
In 1947, Dunlap founded the Women's Veterinary Medical Association, now known as the Association of Women Veterinarians Foundation. She wrote, "through our organization we should offer guidance and help where it is needed, so that others will avoid our mistakes and most easily find happiness and success."

Dunlap edited and contributed to Dr. Joseph Arburua's book, Narrative of Veterinary Medicine in California''. She worked in the toxicology department of the University of California, San Francisco College of Medicine until poor health led to her resignation.

References

1910 births
1992 deaths
American veterinarians
Colorado State University alumni
University of California, San Francisco faculty